Crossings Republik Township is an integrated city project in India, situated on National Highway 24/9 (Delhi Meerut Expressway) in Ghaziabad, Uttar Pradesh stretching towards Greater Noida. The high-rise township spread over 360 acres, covering village [Dundahera] where land acquisition took place from 2004 to 2009. This township is developed by real estate groups like SKB Group, Saviour, Ajnara India Ltd., Assotech, Gaursons India, Mahagun Developers, Panchsheel Promotors, Arihant Build Con Pvt Ltd, Paramount, Exotica Housing, Supertech Limited and many more builders. Crossings Republik have direct connectivity with Delhi Meerut Expressway which is 14 lane expressway. Crossings Republik is well established township with good infrastructure.

Design
The survey feasibility report and marketing was done by CB Richard Ellis, and architect Hafeez Contractor worked on architectural consultancy.

References

External links
 Gaur Global Village
 Crossing Republic Local

Neighbourhoods in Ghaziabad, Uttar Pradesh